In public transport, Route 15 may refer to:

Route 15 (MTA Maryland), a bus route in Baltimore, Maryland and its suburbs
London Buses route 15
SEPTA Route 15, a streetcar route in Philadelphia, Pennsylvania

15